Masayasu Sugitani (born 18 May 1943) is a Japanese equestrian. He competed at the 1968 Summer Olympics, the 1972 Summer Olympics and the 1976 Summer Olympics.

References

1943 births
Living people
Japanese male equestrians
Olympic equestrians of Japan
Equestrians at the 1968 Summer Olympics
Equestrians at the 1972 Summer Olympics
Equestrians at the 1976 Summer Olympics
Sportspeople from Osaka